The Barry Engine first appeared in 1904 when it was exhibited at the Stanley Exhibition in London's Burners Hall. Designed by Charles Benjamin Redrup and manufactured in partnership with Alban Williams by the Barry Motor Company, the engine was a two-cylinder supercharged rotary engine. The prototype motorcycle retained the pedals of a conventional cycle and the engine rotated on the pedal shaft between the driver's knees. The driver was protected by a colander-type perforated cage which enabled cooling air to reach the cylinders.

The engine was reviewed by a number of journals at the time.

Later models of the motorcycle dispensed with the pedals and the engine was lowered to improve the centre of gravity. No known models of the engine exist but a similar Redrup 1912 rotary aircraft engine is in the Manchester Museum of Science and Industry and later Redrup Radial engines designed and built by Redrup are still in existence.

References

Motorcycle engines
Motorcycles powered by rotary engines